The World, the Flesh and the Devil is a 1914 British silent drama film. Now considered a lost film, it was made using the additive color Kinemacolor process.

The title comes from the Litany in the 1662 Book of Common Prayer: "From all the deceits of the world, the flesh, and the devil, spare us, good Lord."

Release
It premièred at the Holborn Empire, High Holborn, London, on 9 April 1914 as part of a Kinemacolor season. It was one of the first full-colour feature films, preceded by With Our King and Queen Through India released in February 1912, and The Miracle in December 1912.

Plot
A very miserable woman hatches a plot to switch the babies of a poor family and a rich family. But the nurse hired to pull off this transfer refuses to go through with it, leaving each baby with its proper family.  When the babies are grown, the man from the poor family (who has been led to believe that he did come from the rich family) goes to the house of the other and throws him out. The remainder of the film deals with the frustrations of mistaken identity.

Cast
 Frank Esmond – Nicholas Brophy
 Stella St. Audrie – Caroline Stanger
 Warwick Wellington – Sir James Hall
 Charles Carter – Rupert Stanger / Dyke
 Rupert Harvey – Robert Hall
 Jack Denton – George Grigg
 Gladys Cunningham – Mrs. Brophy
 Frances Midgeley – Gertrude Grant
 Mercy Hatton – Lady Hall
 H. Agar Lyons – The Devil
 Nell Carter – Beatrice Cuthbert
 Frank Stather – Inspector Toplin
 Roger Hamilton – Wylde

See also
 List of early color feature films
 List of lost films

References

External links
 
 

1914 films
1914 drama films
1910s color films
1914 lost films
British drama films
British silent feature films
Films directed by Floyd Martin Thornton
Lost British films
Silent films in color
Lost drama films
Early color films
1910s English-language films
1910s British films
Silent drama films
English-language drama films